Ancyromonadida or Planomonadida is a small group of biflagellated protists found in the soil and in aquatic habitats, where they feed on bacteria. Includes freshwater or marine organisms, benthic, dorsoventrally compressed and with two unequal flagellae, each emerging from a separate pocket.  The apical anterior flagellum can be very thin or end in the cell membrane, while the posterior flagellum is long and is inserted ventrally or laterally.  The cell membrane is supported by a thin single layer teak and the mitochondrial crests are discoidal / flat.

The group's placement is doubtful, as it seems to fall outside the five supergroups of eukaryotes. Cavalier-Smith considers that they constitute a basal group to Amoebozoa and Opisthokonta and places it together with other related groups in Sulcozoa. However, they appear more basal than Malawimonas, placing them in Loukouzoa, possibly as stem podiates, and depending on the placement of the root position of the Eukaryotes.

Phylogeny

Taxonomy

 Order Ancyromonadida Cavalier-Smith 1998 emend. Atkins 2000
 Family Planomonadidae Cavalier-Smith 2008
 Genus Fabomonas Glücksman & Cavalier-Smith 2013 
 Species Fabomonas tropica Glücksman & Cavalier-Smith 2013 
 Genus Planomonas Cavalier-Smith 2008 emend. Cavalier-Smith 2013
 Species P. brevis Glücksman & Cavalier-Smith 2013 
 Species P. bulbosa Glücksman & Cavalier-Smith 2013
 Species P. cephalopora (Larsen & Patterson 1990) Cavalier-Smith 2008 [Bodo cephalopora Larsen & Patterson 1990; Ancyromonas cephalopora (Larsen & Patterson 1990) Heiss, Walker & Simpson 2010]
 Species P. elongata Glücksman & Cavalier-Smith 2013 
 Species P. melba (Simpson & Patterson 1996) Cavalier-Smith 2008  [Ancyromonas melba Patterson & Simpson 1996]
 Species P. micra Cavalier-Smith 2008  [Ancyromonas micra (Cavalier-Smith 2008) Heiss, Walker & Simpson 2010]
 Family Ancyromonadidae Cavalier-Smith 1993 [Phyllomonadidae Hada 1968]
 Genus Ancyromonas Kent 1880 [Phyllomonas Klebs 1892]
 Species A. abrupta Skvortzov 1957
 Species A. atlantica Glücksman & Cavalier-Smith 2013
 Species A. contorta (Klebs 1883) Lemmermann 1914 [Phyllomonas contorta Klebs 1883]
 Species A. impluvium Lee 2015
 Species A. indica Glücksman & Cavalier-Smith 2013
 Species A. kenti Glücksman & Cavalier-Smith 2013
 Species A. lata Skvortzov 1957
 Species A. magna Zhang & Yang 1993
 Species A. metabolica Skvortzov 1957
 Species A. minuta Skvortzov 1958
 Species A. nitzschiae Skvortzov 1957
 Species A. parasitica Massart
 Species A. prima Skvortzov1957
 Species A. rotundata Skvortzov 1957
 Species A. rugosa Skvortzov 1957
 Species A. sigmoides Kent 1880 sensu Heiss, Walker & Simpson 2010 [Planomonas mylnikovi Cavalier-Smith 2008]
 Species A. sinistra Al-Qassab et al. 2002 [Planomonas sinistra (Al-Qassab et al. 2002) Cavalier-Smith 2008]
 Species A. socialis Skvortzov 1957
 Genus Nutomonas Cavalier-Smith 2013
 Subgenus (Striomonas) Cavalier-Smith 2013
 Species N. longa Cavalier-Smith & Glücksman 2013
 Subgenus (Nutomonas) Cavalier-Smith 2013
 Species N. howeae (Cavalier-Smith 2008) Glücksman & Cavalier-Smith 2013 [Planomonas howeae Cavalier-Smith 2008; Ancyromonas howeae (Cavalier-Smith 2008) Heiss, Walker & Simpson 2010]
 Subspecies N. h. howeae (Cavalier-Smith 2008) Glücksman & Cavalier-Smith 2013
 Subspecies N. h. lacustris Glücksman & Cavalier-Smith 2013
 Species N. limna (Cavalier-Smith 2008) Glücksman & Cavalier-Smith 2013 [Planomonas limna Cavalier-Smith 2008; Ancyromonas limna (Cavalier-Smith 2008) Heiss, Walker & Simpson 2010]
 Subspecies N. l. limna (Cavalier-Smith 2008) Glücksman & Cavalier-Smith 2013
 Subspecies N. l. terrestris Cavalier-Smith & Glücksman 2013

References

External links 

Excavata
Scotokaryotes